Baishevo (Bayış) is a rural locality (a village) in Ishmukhametovsky Selsoviet, Baymaksky District, Bashkortostan, Russia. The population was 505 as of 2010. There are 5 streets.

Geography 
Baishevo is located 50 km southeast of Baymak (the district's administrative centre) by road. Karyshkino is the nearest rural locality.

References 

Rural localities in Baymaksky District